Crashing Las Vegas is a 1956 American comedy film directed by Jean Yarbrough and starring the comedy team The Bowery Boys.  The film was released on April 22, 1956 by Allied Artists and is the 41st film in the series. It was the last of the series to star Leo Gorcey.

Plot
The Bowery Boys' landlady Mrs. Kelly is in need of some money. Through some accident with electricity, Sach gains the ability to predict numbers. The boys get tickets for "Live Like a King", a game show. Thanks to Sach's new power, the boys earn a trip to one of the finest hotels in Las Vegas, Nevada. Sach uses his power to gamble ultimately win money for Mrs. Kelly. However, it's not too long before some curious gangsters want to get in on Sach's 'secret'.

Cast

The Bowery Boys
Leo Gorcey as Terence Aloysius 'Slip' Mahoney
Huntz Hall as Horace Debussy 'Sach' Jones
David Gorcey as Charles 'Chuck' Anderson (Credited as David Condon)
Jimmy Murphy as Myron

Remaining cast
Doris Kemper as Mrs. Kate Kelly
Mary Castle as Carol LaRue
Don Haggerty as Tony Murlock
Terry Frost as Police Sergeant Kelly
Mort Mills as Oggy
Jack Rice as Wiley
Nicky Blair as Sam

Production
Leo Gorcey's last Bowery Boys movie. Leo had a tough time trying to deal with the death of his father, and as a result began to drink heavily. Gorcey appears to be partially inebriated in the finished film. After finishing production, Gorcey demanded an increase in his salary, but Allied Artists Pictures refused to do so. Leo quit the series as a result.

First appearance of 'Myron', played by Jimmy Murphy. According to studio publicity, Murphy was working as a parking valet when he was discovered by Leo Gorcey. Gorcey felt that Murphy had a good face for the movies, and had him hired to be a Bowery Boy.

First appearance of the boys' Irish landlady Mrs. Kate Kelly. In this film, she was played by Doris Kemper. For the next three films in the series, Queenie Smith would play the role. Mrs. Kelly is more or less a replacement for Louie Dumbroski, and her home replaces Louie's Sweet Shop as the Bowery Boys' 'home base'.

Home media
Warner Archives released the film on made-to-order DVD in the United States as part of "The Bowery Boys, Volume Three" on October 1, 2013.

See also
List of American films of 1956
List of films set in Las Vegas

References

External links

1956 films
1956 comedy films
American black-and-white films
American comedy films
Bowery Boys films
1950s English-language films
Films set in the Las Vegas Valley
Allied Artists films
Films directed by Jean Yarbrough
1950s American films